Bognor SA, based in Montevideo, Uruguay is firstly an automotive parts maker, but since 2007 also engages in various joint ventures, building cars from Asian automakers under license. The company was founded in 2000 and employs just over 200 people. Bognor's own current products are protection parts for various armored cars, both passenger cars, as well as commercial and military armored cars.

The company's current customers are all major automotive manufacturers. The products are used in serial sedans like for instance the Mercedes-Benz S-Class. The manufacturer's product range also features parts for stretch limousines, armored fighting vehicles and special vehicles.

Since 2007, Bognor has engaged in several joint ventures with original automakers, to build their vehicles in Bognor's plant, notably with Russian AvtoVAZ (Lada) under Bognor name, as well as with Chinese Chery Automobile, in an agreement to use the SOCMA brand (Argentina); and a venture called Oferol, in cooperation with Hafei, also Chinese.

History
Founded in 1997, Bognor worked as an assembly plant for PSA (Peugeot Citroën) for seven years, assembling Citroën Xsaras in Uruguay. Since then, production shifted to armored cars, and three-wheelers, available for export to any country.

Beginning in 2007, several joint ventures were established with automobile manufacturers, all of them located at the same plant, though legally independent companies. AvtoVAZ (Lada) was the first company that strengthened its cooperation with Bognor SA. In its first year at Bognor, in addition to their regular parts production, the Lada Samara saloon was built as the 'Bognor Sagona' and original Lada Niva SUVs rolled off the production line as 'Bognor Diva'. The latter was factory installed in armored versions, which were mainly ordered by Central and South American customers.

The second joint venture was decided to separate the car-making from the main production company to make the divisions more clear. Chery cars at some point supplanted the outdated Ladas. Involved in the venture was the Argentine SOCMA, to build the Bognor cars as SOCMA Chery, with a production capacity up to 25,000 vehicles a year. In parallel, a third joint venture called Oferol developed, in which Hafei brand cars are manufactured by Bognor. Vehicle identification number of the manufacturer code 9U3, 9UE and 9UF for passenger cars and 9UC and 9UN for SUVs.

Models

See also
Effa Motors
Sevel S.p.A. light commercial vehicles (Italian)

References
 Bognor S.A. TradeData at ComXport.com

External links 
 Bognor S.A. official site
 

Automotive companies of Uruguay
Manufacturing companies of Uruguay
Companies based in Montevideo
Uruguayan brands